Eric George Fraser (11 June 1902 – 15 November 1983) was a British illustrator and graphic artist. He was famous in the public mind for contributions to the Radio Times, and as the creator in 1931 of 'Mr Therm' in adverts for the Gas Light and Coke Company.

Biography
Eric George Fraser was born on 11 June 1902 in Vincent Street, London.

On 4 April 1925 he married Irene Grace Lovett, at St John's church, Smith Square.

In 1935, he moved to Penn's Place, Hampton; where he lived until his death on 15 November 1983 – working in his garden studio until a week before his death.

Fraser illustrated scenes from mythology, such as Beowulf fighting the dragon. With pen and ink he illustrated legendary scenes and several works of Shakespeare.  Many of the drawings for the jackets designed in the 1960s for the Everyman's Library series (published by J. M. Dent & Sons Ltd in Britain and E. P. Dutton in America) were executed by Fraser. He also illustrated J. R. R. Tolkien's books, such as the Folio Society edition of The Lord of the Rings in 1977 as well as the artwork for the 1981 BBC radio adaptation, including the cover of the Radio Times featuring its launch. He also produced designs for Royal Mail.

Further reading
 S. Backemeyer, Eric Fraser Designer and Illustrator with an essay by W. Coates-Smith (1998)  
 Alec Davis, The Graphic Work of Eric Fraser (2nd. ed. 1985)
 D. Driver, The Art of Radio Times: the first sixty years (1981)

References

External links
Eric Fraser at Art of the Print – with image of his "Town by a River"
Eric Fraser at Chris Beetles
Garrick's Temple, Hampton by Fraser at the Twickenham Museum (twickenham-museum.org.uk) (on the museum's page for David Garrick)

Radio Times covers 
 7 October 1938 issue
 1949 Christmas issue
 29 May 1953 Coronation issue
 1958 Christmas issue

1902 births
1983 deaths
British illustrators
Tolkien artists
BBC people
20th-century British artists